Herbert Feltham (18 April 1920 – 26 June 1994) was a South African cricketer. He played in seventeen first-class matches for Eastern Province from 1945/46 to 1951/52.

See also
 List of Eastern Province representative cricketers

References

External links
 

1920 births
1994 deaths
South African cricketers
Eastern Province cricketers
Cricketers from Port Elizabeth